The Race to the Throne (Italian:La corsa al trono) is a 1919 Italian silent film directed by Roberto Roberti and starring Tilde Kassay.

Cast
 Riccardo Achilli 
 Isa De Novegradi 
 Alfredo Infusini 
 Tilde Kassay 
 Gustavo Serena 
 Guido Trento

References

Bibliography
 Gian Piero Brunetta. Il cinema muto italiano: de "La presa di Roma" a "Sole" 1905-1929. Laterza, 2008.

External links

1919 films
1910s Italian-language films
Films directed by Roberto Roberti
Italian silent feature films
Italian black-and-white films